Oberfeldarzt (short: OFArzt or OFA) is a military rank in German speaking armed forces. It denotes a medical staff officer surgeon or medical staff officer dentist and is comparable in rank to lieutenant colonel (de: Oberstleutnant) or (naval) commander (de: Fregattenkapitän) NATO-Rangcode OF4 in anglophone armed forces.

Germany

Bundeswehr
In the Joint Medical Service of the German Bundeswehr
Oberfeldarzt, Oberfeldapotheker, and Oberfeldveterinär are comparable in NATO to the OF-4 rank Oberstleutnant;  Flottillenenarzt, and Flottillenapotheker are equivalent in to the rank Fregattenkapitän, OF-4 as well.

Address
The manner of formal addressing of military surgeons/dentists with the rank Oberfeldarzt is "Herr/Frau Oberfeldarzt"; with the rank Oberfeldapotheker, "Herr/Frau Oberfeldapotheker". A Flottillenenarzt will be addressed "Herr/Frau Flottillenarzt"; and the Flottillenapotheker, "Herr/Frau Flottillenapotheker".

Rank insignias
On the shoulder straps (Heer, Luftwaffe) there are two silver stars in silver oak leaves and the career insignia (de: Laufbahnabzeichen) as symbol of the medical standing, or course of studies. The piping on shoulder straps shows the Waffenfarbe (en: corps- or troop-function colour), corresponding to the appropriate military service, branch, or special force. The corps colour of the "Bundeswehr Joint Medical Service" is dark blue.

In the Navy, the career insignia is in the middle of both sleeves, 3 cm above the cuff strips, and on the shoulder straps between strips and button.

Wehrmacht

Oberfeldarzt of the German Wehrmacht was comparable to the Oberstleutnant / Fregattenkapitän (OF-4), as well as to the Obersturmbannführer and Oberstleutnant of the Waffen-SS.

In line to the so-called Reichsbesoldungsordnung (en: Reich's salary order), appendixes to the Salary law of the German Empire (de: Besoldungsgesetz des Deutschen Reiches) of 1927 (changes 1937 – 1940), the comparative ranks were as follows: C 5

Oberstleutnant (Heer and Luftwaffe)
Fregattenkapitän (Kriegsmarine)
Oberfeldarzt (medical service of the Wehrmacht)
Geschwaderarzt, introduced June 26, 1935 (medical service of the Kriegsmarine)
Oberfeldveterinär from 1934 (veterinarian service of the Wehrmacht)

During wartime, regular assignments of Oberfeldarzt was chief of a, field-, evacuation-, or war hospital (de. Feldlazarett / Krieslazarett). However. However, a field hospital could be managed by an Oberstabsarzt (OF3) as well.

The corps colour of the military Health Service Support (HSS) in German armed forces was traditional dark blue, and of the veterinarian service . This tradition was continued by the medical service corps in Heer and Luftwaffe of the Reichswehr and Wehrmacht.

Kriegsmarine

Austria-Hungary
In the Austria-Hungarian Common Army (de: Gemeinsame Armee or k.u.k. Armee) there was the rank Oberstabsarzt 2. Klasse (en: Senior staff surgeon 2nd class) until 1918 equivalent to Oberfeldarzt in Germany. That particular rank was comparable to the Oberstleutnant OF4-rank (en: colonel) as well.

Switzerland
In the Swiss Armed Forces the Oberfeldarzt of the Army is the most senior representative of the medical service of the Heer. However, the Swiss Oberfeldarzt of the Army might be promoted up to Divisionär (en: Divisional general). This equates to the NATO code of OF-7, or a "two-star rank".

References

Military ranks of Austria
Military ranks of Germany
Military ranks of Switzerland